The People's Republic of China (PRC) was the host nation at the 2022 Winter Olympics in Beijing which took place from 4 to 20 February 2022. China sent its largest ever contingent delegation of 387 personnel to the games, of which 176 were athletes.

Zhao Dan and Gao Tingyu were the country's flag bearers during the opening ceremony. Meanwhile, Xu Mengtao and Gao Tingyu were the closing ceremony flagbearers.

Achievements and records
 Yongqing Lamu (Yangchen Lhamo) and Ciren Zhandui (Tsering Damdul) became the first Tibetan athletes to be qualified for the Winter Olympics, in the snowboarding and cross-country skiing event respectively.
 Dinigeer Yilamujiang became one of the first Uyghur athletes to compete in the Winter Olympics for China, and the first Uyghur-ethnic Chinese to light the Olympics flame.
 It is China's most successful appearance at the Winter Olympics with nine golds and a total of 15 medals, and ranking third on the medal tally by gold medals, and eleventh place by total medals. China also broke the record for the most gold medals won by Asian countries at a single Winter Olympics (9), which was previously set by South Korea in 2010 and 2006 (6).

Medalists

Competitors
The following is a list of the number of competitors participating at the Games per sport/discipline.

Alpine skiing

By using their status as host, China has qualified two male and two female alpine skiers.

Mixed

Biathlon

Men

Women

Mixed

Bobsleigh

* – Denotes the driver of the sled

Cross-country skiing

By using their status as host, China qualified four male cross-country skiers. They also qualified four female skiers, and added a fifth through reallocation.

Distance
Men

Women

Sprint
Men & Women

Curling

Summary

Men's tournament

China has qualified their men's team (five athletes) as the host nation.

Round robin
China had a bye in draws 4, 8, and 12.

Draw 1
Wednesday, 9 February, 20:05

Draw 2
Thursday, 10 February, 14:05

Draw 3
Friday, 11 February, 9:05

Draw 5
Saturday, 12 February, 14:05

Draw 6
Sunday, 13 February, 9:05

Draw 7
Sunday, 13 February, 20:05

Draw 9
Tuesday, 15 February, 9:05

Draw 10
Tuesday, 15 February, 20:05

Draw 11
Wednesday, 16 February, 14:05

Women's tournament

China has qualified their women's team (five athletes) as the host nation.

Round robin
China had a bye in draws 4, 8, and 12.

Draw 1
Thursday, 10 February, 9:05

Draw 2
Thursday, 10 February, 20:05

Draw 3
Friday, 11 February, 14:05

Draw 5
Saturday, 12 February, 20:05

Draw 6
Sunday, 13 February, 14:05

Draw 7
Monday, 14 February, 9:05

Draw 9
Tuesday, 15 February, 14:05

Draw 10
Wednesday, 16 February, 9:05

Draw 11
Wednesday, 16 February, 20:05

Mixed doubles tournament

China has qualified their mixed doubles team (two athletes) as the host nation.

Round robin
China had a bye in draws 3, 5, 7, and 12.

Draw 1
Wednesday, 2 February, 20:05

Draw 2
Thursday, 3 February, 9:05

Draw 4
Thursday, 3 February, 20:05

Draw 6
Friday, 4 February, 13:35

Draw 8
Saturday, 5 February, 14:05

Draw 9
Saturday, 5 February, 20:05

Draw 10
Sunday, 6 February, 9:05

Draw 11
Sunday, 6 February, 14:05

Draw 13
Monday, 7 February, 9:05

Figure skating

In the 2021 World Figure Skating Championships in Stockholm, Sweden, China secured one quota in the men's and ladies singles, two quotas in pairs, and one quota in the ice dance competition.

Team

Freestyle skiing

Aerials

Moguls

Ski cross

Half pipe, Slopestyle and Big Air

Ice hockey

China has qualified 25 male and 23 female competitors to the ice hockey tournaments as part of their two teams.

Due to the lack of ice hockey talent in China, players were recruited from abroad. The men's hockey team had eleven Canadians, nine Chinese, three Americans, and a Russian. Due to their extremely poor performance, their attendance at the games was in question even though they traditionally automatically qualified as the host.

Summary

Men's tournament

China men's national ice hockey team qualified as the host.

Team roster

Group play

Playoffs

Women's tournament

China women's national ice hockey team qualified as the host.

Team roster

Group play

Luge

Singles

Doubles

Team relay

Nordic combined

As host country, China qualified 1 Nordic combined athlete, and this is the country's debut in the competitions

Short track speed skating 

China qualified all three relays and the maximum of five athletes in each gender.

Men

Women

Mixed

Qualification legend: FA - Qualify to medal final; FB - Qualify to consolation final

Skeleton

Ski jumping

Men

Women

Mixed

Snowboarding

Freestyle
Men

Women

Parallel

Snowboard cross

Qualification legend: FA – Qualify to medal round; FB – Qualify to consolation round

Speed skating 

China qualified 6 men and 8 women in the speed skating event.

Men

Women

Mass start

Team pursuit

References

Nations at the 2022 Winter Olympics
2022
Winter Olympics